Kiril Peychinovich or Kiril Pejčinoviḱ (Church Slavonic: Күриллъ Пейчиновићь (c. 1770 – 7 March 1845)) was a Bulgarian cleric, writer and enlightener, one of the first supporters of the use of modern Bulgarian (as opposed to Church Slavonic), and one of the early figures of the Bulgarian National Revival. 

Although he died before the earliest expressions of Macedonian identity, thought of his language as Bulgarian, and regarded as his homeland Lower Moesia, i.e. Bulgaria, according to the post-WWII Macedonian historiography he was an ethnic Macedonian. In modern-day North Macedonia, Peychinovich is considered one of the earliest contributors to modern Macedonian literature. In October 2022 he was canonized by the Macedonian Orthodox Church as a saint under the name Kiril Lešočki.

Biography

Early life and Mount Athos
Peychinovich was born in the large Polog village of Tearce (Теарце) in present-day North Macedonia (then part of the Ottoman Empire). His secular name is unknown. According to his tombstone, he received his primary education in the village of Lešok (Лешок). Probably he later studied at the Monastery of St. John Bigorski near Debar. Kiril's father, Peychin, sold his property in Tearce and, together with his brother and his son, moved to the monastery of Hilandar in Mount Athos where the three became monks. Peychin accepted the name Pimen, his brother — Dalmant, and his son — Kiril (Cyril). Later Kiril returned to Tetovo from there set out for the Kičevo Monastery of the Holy Immaculate Theotokos, where he became a hieromonk.

Hegumen of Marko's Monastery

Since 1801 Peychinovich was the hegumen of Marko's Monastery of Saint Demetrius near Skopje. Located in the region of Torbešija (Торбешия or Торбешија) along the valley of the Markova Reka (Marko's River) among Pomak, Turkish and Albanian villages, the monastery was in a miserable condition before Peychinovich's arrival. Almost all buildings except for the primary church had been destroyed. Through the course of 17 years until 1798 father Kiril made serious efforts to revive the monastery, paying particular attention to the reconstruction and expansion of the monastical library.

In Marko's Monastery Kiril Peychinovich compiled one of his best-known works, Kniga Siya Zovomaya Ogledalo, printed in 1816 in Budapest.

Hegumen of the Lešok Monastery
It is not known why father Kiril left Marko's Monastery, but according to the legend, a conflict between him and the Greek metropolitan of Skopje was the reason for his departure. In 1818 Peychinovich once again travelled to Mount Athos to see his father and uncle, and then became hegumen of the Monastery of Saint Athanasius (destroyed in 1710 by Janissaries) near the Polog village of Lešok in the proximity of his native Tearce. With the aid of the local Bulgarians Kiril restored the Lešok Monastery, which had been abandoned for 100 years. Kiril devoted himself to a considerable amount of preacher's, literary and educational work. He opened a school and tried to establish a printing press, convinced of the printed book's importance. Father Kiril later helped Teodosiy Sinaitski (Теодосий Синаитски) restore his printing press in Thessaloniki which had been burnt down in 1839. In 1840 Theodosius issued Peychinovich's second book, Kniga Glagolemaya Uteshenie Greshnim. Father Kiril Peychinovich died on 12 March 1845 in the Lešok Monastery and was buried in the churchyard. In 1934 the village of Burumli in Ruse Province, Bulgaria was renamed Peychinovo in honour of father Kiril.

Works
Kiril Peychinovich is the author of three books, two printed and one manuscript (Zhitie i Sluzhba na Tsar Lazar), all three devoted to religion.
[[File:Pejchinovich-ogledalo.jpg|left|thumb|150px|Ogledalo'''s title page]]

OgledaloOgledalo ("Mirror")  has a form of a sermon with a liturgical-ascetical character. It is an original work of the Author, inspired by the Kolivari (also called Filokalist) movement on Mount Athos, that was fighting for a liturgical renewal within the Eastern Orthodox Church on the Balkans. For this aim the Kolivari were using the spoken language of the people, according to the region where they were translating and writing. The most important topics of the work are: the significance of the liturgical life, the preparation for the Holy Communion, the regularly receiving of the Holy Communion. Especially important is his argumentation against the superstition and on the importance of the individual ascetic life and the participation in the liturgical life of the Church. In addition, a collection of Christian prayers and instructions, some of which written by father Kiril himself are added on the end of the work.Милан Ѓорѓевиќ, Агиоритското просветителство на преподобен Кирил Пејчиновиќ II (The Hagioretic Enlightenment of Venerable Kiril Pejcinovic), study, in: “Премин”, бр. 43-44, Скопје 2007

According to the book's title page, it was written in the 'most common and illiterary Bulgarian language of Lower Moesia' ('препростейшим и некнижним язиком Болгарским долния Мисии'). It was printed in 1816 in Budapest.

Utesheniе Greshnim
Peychinovich's second book, Utesheniе Greshnim ("Solace of the sinner"), much like his first, is a Christian collection of instructions — including advice on how weddings should be organized and how those who had sinned should be consoled, as well as a number of instructive tales.
[[File:Pejchinovich2.jpg|right|thumb|150px|Utesheniе Greshnim's title page]]Utesheniе Greshnim was ready to be printed in 1831, as specified by father Kiril in a note in the original manuscript. It was sent to Belgrade to be printed, but this did not happen for an unknown reason, and it had to be printed in Thessaloniki nine years later, in 1840, by Theodosius of Sinai. During the printing Theodosius substituted Peychinovich's original introduction with his own one, but still preserved the text that referred to the language of the work as the 'common Bulgarian language of Lower Moesia, of Skopje and Tetovo' (простїй Ѧзыкъ болгарский долнїѦ Мүссїи Скопсский и Тетовский).

Poems
In 1835 Peychinovich composed an epitaph for himself in verse.

Теарце му негово рождение
Пречиста и Хилендар пострижение
Лешок му е негоо воспитание
Под плочава негоо почивание
От негово свое отшествие
До Христово второ пришествие
Молит вас бракя негои любимия
Хотящия прочитати сия
Да речете Бог да би го простил
Зере у гроб цръвите ги гостил
Овде лежи Кирилово тело
У манастир и у Лешок село
Да Бог за доброе дело.

References and notes

External links
 ""Книга сия зовомая Огледало", Будапеща, 1816 година - Ogledalo'' (Mirror) online
Pejčinoviḱ's Biography and work 
Kiril Peychinovich (ca. 1770 - 1845) 
Biography 
Kiril Pejčinoviḱ 

18th-century Bulgarian people
19th-century Bulgarian people
1770 births
1845 deaths
Christian writers
Bulgarian Christian religious leaders
Bulgarian writers
Macedonian Bulgarians
People associated with Hilandar Monastery